The John G. Rangos School of Health Sciences (RSHS) is one of the ten constituent colleges that comprise Duquesne University in Pittsburgh, Pennsylvania.

History
On January 29, 1990, Dr. John E. Murray Jr., then President of Duquesne University, announced the creation of a School of Health Sciences in order to "graduate professionals who will provide assistance to people in maintaining their physical well-being. It will make them more self-sufficient physically and provide great hope for their futures. It meets an overwhelming societal need, and it enlarges opportunities for students at Duquesne. In serving the citizens of Western Pennsylvania, and our students, this initiative is precisely in accordance with the purposes of Duquesne University." On March 18, 1991, Mr. John G. Rangos Sr. made a major gift to Duquesne University in support of the school, and so it was announced that the school would be named after him.

Programs
The Rangos School houses such programs as Athletic Training (B.S.), Health Management Systems (B.S., M.H.M.S.), Occupational Therapy (M.S.), Physical Therapy (D.P.T.), Physician Assistant (M.P.A.), Speech-Language Pathology (M.S.), and the Ph.D. in Rehabilitation Science. In addition, the school offers a variety of bachelor's degree programs, entry-level master's degree programs, master's degree programs, a doctor of physical therapy program, joint and second degree opportunities, and inter-school majors and minors.

Administration
The dean of the school is Gregory H. Frazer, Ph.D.

References

External links
The John G. Rangos School of Health Sciences website

School John G. Rangos
Educational institutions established in 1990
Health sciences schools in the United States
1990 establishments in Pennsylvania